Quirella is a genus of sea snails, marine gastropod mollusks in the family Pyramidellidae, the pyrams and their allies.

Species
Species within the genus Quirella include:
 Quirella coarguta Peñas & Rolán, 2017
 Quirella disjunctacostae Peñas & Rolán, 2017
 Quirella explicita Peñas & Rolán, 2017
 Quirella fragilis Peñas & Rolán, 2017
 Quirella humilis (Preston, 1905)
 Quirella limitavi Peñas & Rolán, 2017
 Quirella lyngei Robba, Di Geronimo, Chaimanee, Negri & Sanfilippo, 2004
 Quirella mirationis Laseron, 1959
 Quirella mirifica Peñas & Rolán, 2017
 Quirella pabloi Peñas & Rolán, 2017
 Quirella parvireticulata Peñas & Rolán, 2017
 Quirella producta Peñas & Rolán, 2017
 Quirella subattenuata Peñas & Rolán, 2017
 Quirella suprafila Laseron, 1959
 Quirella umbilicostriata Peñas & Rolán, 2017
 Quirella vavauensis Peñas & Rolán, 2017

References

 C.F. Laseron (1959), The Family Pyramidellidae (Mollusca) from Northern Australia; Australian Journal of Marine and Freshwater Research 10(2) 177 - 268; 
 Peñas A. & Rolán E. (2017). Deep water Pyramidelloidea from the central and South Pacific. The tribe Chrysallidini. ECIMAT (Estación de Ciencias Mariñas de Toralla), Universidade de Vigo. 412 pp.

External links
 To World Register of Marine Species

Pyramidellidae
Gastropod genera